The High Commissioner of India to the People's Republic of Bangladesh is the chief diplomatic representative of India to Bangladesh. The high commission is located in the Diplomatic enclave of Baridhara, Dhaka.

The high commission is headed by the High commissioner, while four other Assistant High Commissions of India are located in four major cities of the country, which are headed by an Assistant High Commissioner.

List of Indian High Commissioners to Bangladesh 

The following IFS officers have served as High Commissioners of India to Bangladesh.

Assistant High Commissioners

Alongside that there are 4 Assistant High Commissioners, appointed in four cities: Chittagong, Khulna, Rajshahi, and Sylhet.

References 

Bangladesh and the Commonwealth of Nations
India and the Commonwealth of Nations
 
India
Bangladesh
1968 establishments in India